The Asian Football Confederation's 1995 AFC Women's Championship was held from 23 September to 2 October 1995 in Malaysia. The tournament was won by for the fifth consecutive time by China in the final against Japan.

Group stage

Group A

Group B

Group C

Best teams in second place
In 4 team groups record against the bottom team was excluded.

Knockout stage

Semi-final

Third place match

Final

Winner

External links
 RSSSF.com

Women's Championship
AFC Women's Asian Cup tournaments
International association football competitions hosted by Malaysia
Afc
AFC Women's Championship
AFC Women's Championship
AFC Championship
AFC Women's Championship